Kalinovac is a municipality in the Koprivnica-Križevci County in Croatia. According to the 2011 census, there are 1,597 inhabitants in the area, with Croats forming an absolute majority.

History
In the late 19th century and early 20th century, Kalinovac was part of the Bjelovar-Križevci County of the Kingdom of Croatia-Slavonia.

Notable people

Josip Manolić (Kalinovac, 1920), Yugoslav state security official and Croatian politician, first prime minister of independent Croatia (1991)

References

Municipalities of Croatia
Populated places in Koprivnica-Križevci County